Xi Nanhua (born March 1963) is a Chinese mathematician currently serving as President of the Institute of Mathematics and Systems Sciences, Chinese Academy of Sciences and Dean of the College of Mathematics, University of Chinese Academy of Sciences.

Biography
Xi was born in Yingde, Guangdong in March 1963, while his ancestral home is in Qidong County, Hunan. After the resumption of college entrance examination, he graduated from Huaihua University. In 1982 he entered East China Normal University, where he earned his master's degree and Ph.D. in mathematics. He conducted post-doctoral research at the Institute of Mathematics, Chinese Academy of Sciences (CAS). He was elected an academician of the CAS in 2009. He was vice president of the University of Chinese Academy of Sciences between 2014 and 2017. He is now President of the CAS Institute of Mathematics and Systems Sciences and Dean of the College of Mathematics, University of the Chinese Academy of Sciences.

Awards
 2001, Morningside Medal (Silver)
 2005, 10th Chen Xingshen Mathematics Award
 2007, Second Prize of the State Natural Science Award

References

1963 births
People from Yingde
People from Qidong County
Living people
Huaihua University alumni
East China Normal University alumni
Members of the Chinese Academy of Sciences
Academic staff of the University of the Chinese Academy of Sciences
Mathematicians from Guangdong
Members of the 14th Chinese People's Political Consultative Conference